The Ford Wixom Assembly Plant was a Ford Motor Company manufacturing facility in Wixom, Michigan, with production reaching 6,648,806 over the fifty years it was operational (1957–2007).

History
As one of Ford's largest and oldest manufacturing sites, Wixom opened April 15, 1957, and was ultimately expanded to 4.7 million square feet, replacing the former Lincoln Motor Company Plant at 6200 West Warren Avenue (at Livernois).  The first car manufactured August 1, 1957 was the Lincoln Capri, and the last car produced was a white chocolate Lincoln Town Car which rolled off the line at 12:55pm on May 31, 2007.

The plant only created components and manufactured complete Lincoln cars as well as the Ford Thunderbird — along with the Lincoln Town Car, the Ford GT40 of the 1960s and the Ford GT of the 2000s. Components were also shipped in knock-down kits and sent to only two dedicated branch assembly locations in California. Production of the Lincoln LS ended in early April 2006 and production of the Ford GT stopped on September 21, leaving the Town Car as the plant's final Ford Motor Company product.

Wixom was the most profitable plant in the industry during the 1980s when Cadillac downsized its lineup and lost ground to Lincoln. Due to Lincoln's falling sales, Ford announced on January 23, 2006 it would sell the Wixom plant in 2007 as part of its The Way Forward. Some analysts argued that the plant might not be closed. A report in The Oakland Press said "the fate of the Wixom plant, however, will depend on the shape of Ford's future product plan, which seems to be currently in flux." Michigan governor, Jennifer Granholm, reportedly offered $115 million in tax cuts to keep the plant open. The plant was closed in 2007, and by mid-June 2008, while Ford was able to find buyers for other idled plants, Wixom remained unsold until 2008 purchase by General Motors.

Several alternative energy uses were announced, but none came to fruition.  In 2012, Ford began demolishing the plant. The next year the Baidas family, owners and operators of General RV Center, sought and were awarded mixed use zoning permits in an area nearby of the Wixom property.  In 2014 the family broke ground on 33 acres near the Wixom property to build a new corporate headquarters and RV Dealership. A Menards outlet has also been built on the site.

Products
 1958–1959 Lincoln Capri
 1958–1960 Lincoln Premiere
 1960 Lincoln
 1958–1960 Continental Mark III, IV & V
 1958–1976 Ford Thunderbird
 1961–2002 Lincoln Continental
 1964–1969 Ford GT40 Mk IV
 1969–1971 Continental Mark III
 1972–1976 Continental Mark IV
 1977–1979 Continental Mark V
 1980–1983 Continental Mark VI
 1981–2007 Lincoln Town Car
 1984–1985 Continental Mark VII
 1986–1992 Lincoln Mark VII
 1993–1998 Lincoln Mark VIII 
 2000–2006 Lincoln LS
 2002–2005 Ford Thunderbird
 2005–2006 Ford GT

See also
 List of Ford factories

References
  
  

Ford factories
Former motor vehicle assembly plants
Motor vehicle assembly plants in Michigan
Buildings and structures in Oakland County, Michigan
1957 establishments in Michigan